Bondax is an electronic music duo consisting of English musicians Adam Kaye (born 1 April 1994) and George Townsend (born 17 September 1993). The group gained prominence primarily as a result of BBC Radio, initially through BBC Introducing Lancashire before receiving BBC Radio 1 airtime from the a range of DJs including Nick Grimshaw and Annie Mac. Bondax's sound has often been described as genre-transcending; Moses Wiener of Dazed details the band's sound as "the aural equivalent of sipping an ice-cold Pimms on the balcony of your council estate flat.".

Kaye and Townsend studied at QES (Queen Elizabeth School) Kirkby Lonsdale.

In 2012, Bondax started their own record label, Just Us Recordings. The first release on the label was a track by fellow producer Karma Kid entitled "It's Always".

In 2013, the duo performed at a number of festivals across Europe, including Bestival, Creamfields, and Beacons.

Discography

Singles

Extended plays
 Baby I Got That (2012), Relentless Records

References

English electronic music duos
Future garage musicians
Musical groups from Lancashire
Relentless Records artists
Electronic dance music duos